The 1979–80 Missouri Tigers men's basketball team represented the University of Missouri during the 1979–80 NCAA men's basketball season. Led by legendary coach Norm Stewart, the Tigers won the Big 8 regular season title by three games, but were upset in the semifinal round of the Big 8 Tournament. Missouri reached the Sweet Sixteen of the NCAA Tournament before being eliminated by Louisiana State to finish with a 25–6 record (11–3 Big 8).

Roster
Curtis Berry, Jr.
Mark Dressler, Sr.
Larry Drew, Sr.
Ricky Frazier, Fr.
Steve Stipanovich, Fr.
Jon Sundvold, Fr.

Head coach: Norm Stewart

Schedule and results

|-
!colspan=9 style=| Regular Season

|-
!colspan=9 style=| Big 12 Tournament

|-
!colspan=9 style=| NCAA Tournament

Rankings

Awards

All Big Eight: Curtis Berry, Larry Drew

References

Missouri
Missouri
Missouri Tigers men's basketball seasons
Tiger
Tiger